Oregon's Most Endangered Places, established in 2011, is a list compiled by the Historic Preservation League of Oregon that raises awareness of the state's "historic treasures in need of the advocacy and support to save them from demise".

Listings
The League's first list of endangered places was released in 2011 and included ten sites. The 2012 and 2013 lists included nine and ten sites, respectively. Portland holds the record for the most number of sites on the list, with three. Two sites from both Astoria and Redmond have been included.

See also 

 Historic preservation
 History of Oregon
 Lists of Oregon-related topics
 National Register of Historic Places listings in Oregon

References 

2011 establishments in Oregon
Historic preservation in the United States
History of Oregon
Oregon geography-related lists